Calestano is a comune (municipality) in the Province of Parma in the Italian region Emilia-Romagna, located about  west of Bologna and about  southwest of Parma.

Calestano borders the following municipalities: Berceto, Corniglio, Felino, Langhirano, Sala Baganza, Terenzo.

References

External links
 Official website

Cities and towns in Emilia-Romagna